José Chávez may refer to:
 José Chávez (actor) (1916–1988), Mexican actor
 José Chávez (footballer) (born 1983), Mexican footballer
 José Chávez Morado (1909–2002), Mexican painter and sculptor
 José Chávez y Castillo, Mexican landowner and trader who served as provisional Governor of New Mexico in 1845
 Jose Chavez y Chavez (1851–1924), outlaw from the U.S. state of New Mexico
 José María Chávez Alonso (1812–1864), Mexican politician
 José Luis Chávez (born 1986), Bolivian footballer